Stain is a Ugandan drama film produced and directed by Morris Mugisha. It premiered in Kampala on March 1, 2021, and was Mugisha's directorial debut. The film received 7 nominations at the Africa Movie Academy Awards in Nigeria and Joan Agaba won the award for Best Actress in a Leading role. The film also won 5 awards out of 12 nominations at the 2021 Uganda Film Festival Awards.

Plot
A 29-year-old mother of one, Mina, takes over as breadwinner in the home when her husband Bomboka is maimed after a domestic wrangle.

Nominations and awards

References

External links
 Stain - Radio Times
 

Ugandan drama films
Films set in Uganda
2021 films
Films shot in Uganda
2020s English-language films